"Zoom-Zoom-Zoom" (also known as "Zum Zum Zum" or "Zoom Zoom") is the title of a capoeira song, made popular by the 1993 movie, Only The Strong, for whose soundtrack it was recorded by Jibril Serapis Bey. It is one of three Serapis Bey recordings which appear on the soundtrack to the film. Another recording of "Zum Zum Zum" was made by Spank for the year 2000 Mazda car commercials in conjunction with the company's slogan "Zoom-Zoom."

The song is not related to "Zoom Zoom Zoom," a 1958 doo-wop single by The Collegians.

References 

Capoeira films
Songs used as jingles
1993 songs
Mazda